Helen Cox High School is a high school located in Harvey, in unincorporated area Jefferson Parish, Louisiana, United States.

It serves portions of several communities, including Harvey, Gretna, Timberlane, and Woodmere.

The school is a part of the Jefferson Parish Public Schools system. The school primarily serves the Harvey and Gretna areas of Jefferson Parish. The school's mascot is "Charlie" the Cougar (Felis concolor), and the school colors are scarlet (red) and (vegas) gold.

History
Helen Cox's namesake was the first principal of the Gretna Public High School. It was first opened in 1969. Helen Cox was once a middle school (6th-8th grade), then became a junior high school (7th-9th grade) and in 2004 Helen Cox became a high school (9th-12th grade).

Athletics
Helen Cox High athletics competes in the LHSAA.

Notable alumni
 Greg Monroe, NBA player

References

External links

Public high schools in Louisiana
Schools in Jefferson Parish, Louisiana